The Fire of London Disputes Act 1666 was an Act of the Parliament of England (18 & 19 Cha. II c. 7) with the long title "An Act for erecting a Judicature for Determination of Differences touching Houses burned or demolished by reason of the late Fire which happened in London." Following the Great Fire of London, Parliament established a court to settle all differences arising between landlords and tenants of burnt buildings, overseen by judges of the King's Bench, Court of Common Pleas and Court of Exchequer. 

The 22 judges who served under the act included the following:
Sir John Archer
Sir Robert Atkyns
 Sir Edward Atkins
Sir Orlando Bridgeman
 Sir Samuel Brown
Sir William Ellys
Sir Heneage Finch
Sir Matthew Hale
 Sir John Kelynge
Sir Timothy Littleton
Sir William Morton
Sir Francis North
 Sir Richard Rainsford
Sir Edward Thurland
Sir Christopher Turnor
Sir Edward Turnour
Sir Thomas Twisden
Sir Thomas Tyrrell
Sir John Vaughan
Sir William Wilde
 Sir Hugh Wyndham
 Sir Wadham Wyndham

Portraits of the judges by John Michael Wright were put up in the Guildhall by the city in gratitude for their services. These paintings, completed in 1670, hung in London's Guildhall until it was bombed during World War II; today only two (those of Sir Matthew Hale and Sir Hugh Wyndham) remain in the Guildhall Art Gallery the remainder having been destroyed or dispersed, mainly to the Inner Temple, Lincoln's Inn and the Royal Courts of justice.

The act was repealed by the Statute Law Revision Act 1948.

References

The Fire of London occurred in the year 1666 where it burned the whole of the City of London. The fire started in a local bakery by the River Thames.

1666 in law
Acts of the Parliament of England
17th century in London
1666 in England
Great Fire of London
Law in London